Prokelisia is a genus of delphacid planthoppers in the family Delphacidae. There are about five described species in Prokelisia.

Species
These five species belong to the genus Prokelisia:
 Prokelisia carolae Wilson, 1982
 Prokelisia crocea (Van Duzee, 1897)
 Prokelisia dolus Wilson, 1982
 Prokelisia marginata (Van Duzee, 1897)
 Prokelisia salina (Ball, 1902)

References

Further reading

 
 
 
 
 
 

Articles created by Qbugbot
Auchenorrhyncha genera
Delphacini